Area codes 256 and 938 are telephone area codes in the North American Numbering Plan (NANP) for North Alabama, as well as some eastern portions of the state. The two area codes form an overlay plan for the same numbering plan area. Area code 256 was created in 1998, and 938 was added in 2010.

History
Area code 256 was created on March 23, 1998, in an area code split from area code 205. A permissive dialing period, that permitted time to reprogram computers, cell phones, pagers and fax machines, allowed the use of 205 through September 28, 1998.

In March 2009, the Alabama Public Service Commission announced that the state's first all-services overlay area code, 938, would be added to the area of the 256 area code "sometime in 2011". As a result, ten-digit dialing was implemented for all numbers in the area with voluntary compliance beginning on November 7, 2009, and mandatory use by June 5, 2010, instead of dialing 7 digits.  The 938 area code took effect on July 10, 2010.  This timing roughly coincided with the end of the originally projected 12-year "life span" of the original 256 area code.

Service area
The numbering plan area comprises north and northeast Alabama and includes the following metropolitan areas:
 Huntsville Metropolitan Area
 Decatur Metropolitan Area
 The Shoals
 Gadsden Metropolitan Statistical Area
 Anniston-Oxford Metropolitan Area

Counties

Blount County (part, near Arab on Brindlee Mountain, most of Blount County is in area code 205)
Calhoun County (part, some of Calhoun County is in area code 205)
Cherokee County
Clay County
Cleburne County
Colbert County
Coosa County
Cullman County
DeKalb County
Elmore County (part, most of Elmore County is in area code 334)
Etowah County (part, some of Etowah County is in area code 205)
Franklin County (part, some of Franklin County is in area code 205)
Jackson County
Lawrence County
Lauderdale County
Limestone County
Madison County
Marshall County
Morgan County
Randolph County (part, some of Randolph County is in area code 334)
Saint Clair County (part, the Steele area. Most of Saint Clair County is in area code 205)
Talladega County (part, the Lincoln area is in area code 205)
Tallapoosa County (part, some of Tallapoosa County is in area code 334)
Winston County (part, most of Winston County is in area code 205)

Cities

Albertville
Alexander City
Anniston
Arab
Ashland
Athens
Attalla
Boaz
Bridgeport
Centre
Collinsville
Cullman
Dadeville
Decatur
Edwardsville
Florence
Fort Payne
Gadsden
Guntersville
Hanceville
Hartselle
Heflin
Henagar
Hobson City
Hokes Bluff
Huntsville
Jacksonville
Leesburg
Lineville
Madison
Moulton
Muscle Shoals
Oxford
Paint Rock
Piedmont
Rainbow City
Rainsville
Red Bay
Reece City
Rockford
Russellville
Saks
Scottsboro
Sheffield
Somerville
Stevenson
Sylacauga
Talladega
Tuscumbia
Weaver
Wedowee

See also
List of Alabama area codes
List of NANP area codes
List of area code overlays

References

External links

938 Area Code

Telecommunications-related introductions in 1998
Telecommunications-related introductions in 2010
256
256